Coptorhynchus is a genus of weevils in the tribe Celeuthetini. Species are found in South-East Asia.

Coptorhynchus Desbrochers, 1892 is a synonym for Ithystenus.

References

External links 

 
 Coptorhynchus at insectoid.info

Entiminae
Curculionidae genera